This article lists the heads of state of the Comoros, since the country gained independence from France in 1975.

List of officeholders

Timeline

Succession
Article 58 of the Comorian Constitution states that "in case of absolute absence of a President" the following should happen:
 If the absence (death, resignation, etc.) should occur within the first 900 days of the term, the cabinet ministers and other members of the government select among the ministers a "main minister" to serve as Interim President. Elections must also be called in no more than 60 days after the absence of the President occurs; the person who wins those elections will be president for the remainder of the original five-year presidential term.
 If the absence should occur beyond the first 900 days of the term, then the Governor of the island currently holding the presidency will assume the presidency until the end of the original five-year presidential term, at which point regular elections are held.

Latest election

See also
 Politics of the Comoros
 List of sultans on the Comoros
 List of colonial governors of the Comoros
 List of prime ministers of the Comoros
 Vice-President of the Comoros

References

External links
 World Statesmen – Comoros

Heads of state
Heads of state
c
Heads of state
Heads of state